The 1993 Wagner Seahawks football team represented Wagner College in the 1993 NCAA Division I-AA football season. It was their first year competing as an NCAA Division I-AA independent after transitioning from NCAA Division III. The Seahawks were led by 13th-year head coach Walt Hameline and played their home games at Wagner College Stadium. They finished the season 9–2 and won the ECAC–IFC Division I-AA Bowl, beating , 32–0.

Schedule

References

Wagner
Wagner Seahawks football seasons
ECAC Bowl champion seasons
Wagner Seahawks football